Afghanistan has submitted films for the Academy Award for Best International Feature Film since 2002, following the fall of the country's previous Taliban government. The award is handed out annually by the United States Academy of Motion Picture Arts and Sciences to a feature-length motion picture produced outside the United States that contains primarily non-English dialogue. It was not created until the 1956 Academy Awards, in which a competitive Academy Award of Merit, known as the Best Foreign Language Film Award, was created for non-English speaking films, and has been given annually since.

, fourteen Afghan films have been submitted for the Academy Award for Best International Feature Film, but none of them have been nominated for an Oscar.

Submissions
The Academy of Motion Picture Arts and Sciences has invited the film industries of various countries to submit their best film for the Academy Award for Best Foreign Language Film since 1956. The Foreign Language Film Award Committee oversees the process and reviews all the submitted films. Following this, they vote via secret ballot to determine the five nominees for the award. Below is a list of the films that have been submitted by Afghanistan for review by the Academy for the award by year and the respective Academy Awards ceremony.

 FireDancer was Afghanistan's first-ever Oscar submission. The film, about the Afghan-American diaspora in New York City, was filmed primarily in English with some scenes in Dari. In order to fulfill AMPAS requirements, the film held screenings in two venues in Kabul- a newly reopened cinema, and a stadium that was previously used by the Taliban for executions. The print used for the Afghan screenings as well as that submitted to the Academy was dubbed entirely into Dari. The film's writer-director Jawed Wassel, an Afghan-American who had received asylum in the United States in the 1980s, was brutally murdered while the film was in post-production. The film's producer Nathan Powell pleaded guilty to the crime.
 Osama, about a young girl forced to pose as a boy in order to work and support her family under the brutal Taliban regime was considered an early favorite for an Oscar nomination after winning the Golden Globe award for Best Foreign Language Film, but it ultimately failed to be nominated.
 Earth and Ashes, directed by France-based dual Afghan-French citizen Atiq Rahimi, was a drama about an old man and his grandson on a long journey to inform the man's son of tragic news.
 16 Days in Afghanistan, despite its positive reception in both Afghanistan and in the west was unable to participate as it did not meet some of the qualifications. 
 The Opium War, a black comedy featuring a mixed American and Afghan cast, was about the uneasy interaction between two downed American soldiers and an Afghan family of poppy growers. The film reunited Osama director Siddiq Barmak and the titular lead of that film, Marina Golbahari.

In 2009, A British documentary filmed in Afghanistan in languages native to Afghanistan, (Afghan Star) was selected to represent the United Kingdom.

See also
List of Academy Award winners and nominees for Best Foreign Language Film
List of Academy Award-winning foreign language films
Cinema of Afghanistan

Notes

References

External links
The Official Academy Awards Database
The Motion Picture Credits Database
IMDb Academy Awards Page

Afghanistan
Academy Award